Wellesley Hills station is an MBTA Commuter Rail station in Wellesley, Massachusetts, United States. It serves the Framingham/Worcester Line. It is located off Washington Street (MA-16) in Wellesley, Massachusetts. Wellesley Hills has two low platforms serving the line's two tracks; it is not accessible. Designed in 1885 and completed in 1886, the station was the last of nine stations that H.H. Richardson designed for the Boston and Albany Railroad. It replaced a previous station, built in 1834 with the completion of the Boston and Worcester Railroad.

History

The Boston & Worcester Railroad (B&W), extending outwards from Boston, reached through the West Parish of Needham in mid-1834. North Needham station was the terminus for a few months while construction continued towards Worcester. In 1839, the line was double tracked through the area.

The station was later renamed Grantvile, then briefly Nehoiden, and finally Wellesley Hills in 1881 when the West Parish was fully separated from Needham as the town of Wellesley.

Wellesley Hills station was designed by Henry Hobson Richardson in 1885 for the Boston & Albany Railroad, and was the last in a series of stations he designed, all featuring rough-cut light colored stone with dark stone trim around windows and doors, slate roofs, and varying amounts of decorative dark stone carvings. As a B&A station, it originally served both commuter trains in the Boston Metropolitan Area and long distance trains toward Albany, New York.

By 1962, the disused station building was converted to a dry cleaning shop, with large plate glass windows added to the façade. Though the platforms are still active for railroad service today, the station house is currently occupied by Caffè Nero, described as a European coffee house. The portion facing the street has been renovated and the original roofing has been removed. However, the sides and back of the building have been preserved, though the windows are boarded up and large air conditioning units have been installed. The previous station building, constructed in 1855, has been moved across the road and converted to a private residence.

In June 2021, the MBTA issued a $28 million design contract for a project to add a third track from Weston to Framingham, including reconstruction of the three Wellesley stations and West Natick station. The project was expected to cost around $400 million, of which rebuilding Wellesley Hills station would be $43–45 million, with completion in 2030.

References

External links

MBTA - Wellesley Hills
 Cliff Road entrance from Google Maps Street View
 Station from Google Maps Street View

Former Boston and Albany Railroad stations
MBTA Commuter Rail stations in Norfolk County, Massachusetts
Railway stations in the United States opened in 1885
Richardsonian Romanesque architecture in Massachusetts
Henry Hobson Richardson buildings
Wellesley, Massachusetts